David Amber (born April 21, 1971) is a Canadian anchor for Sportsnet  as a host and reporter. He is best known for his time doing NHL On the Fly on the NHL Network and as the anchor for  Gate 5 Live, Raptors Pregame, and Raptors Post Up on NBA TV Canada. He had been an anchor and reporter for ESPN and its family of networks.

Biography
Amber, who had appeared on ESPN networks since 2002, was based in Toronto, contributing to SportsCenter, Outside the Lines, Baseball Tonight and College GameDay. A reporter since 2006, Amber had provided coverage from the NBA Finals, MLB postseason and other major events, as well as serving as a sideline reporter for NCAA football and the World Baseball Classic.

Amber joined ESPN as an ESPNEWS anchor in 2002, also anchoring Outside the Lines, NHL2Night and NCAA basketball.

Prior to ESPN, Amber served as a reporter and anchor for TSN in Toronto (1997–2002). At TSN, Amber reported from two Olympic Games, and several World Series, Stanley Cup Finals, and NBA Finals. From 1999–2001 he was a courtside reporter for TSN's broadcasts of Toronto Raptors games.

Amber joined NHL Network before the 2010-11 NHL season as host of NHL Tonight. Amber also serves as co-host for the Network's coverage at the NHL's signature events and exclusive programming. He joined the Hockey Night in Canada team at the start of the 2011-12 NHL season. After Rogers Media secured a 12-year, $5.2 billion deal for the  exclusive national NHL rights at the start of the 2014-15 season, Amber has joined Sportsnet to serve as a reporter for their coverage.

From 2016-2022, he became the studio host of the late game of Hockey Night in Canada, after the departure of George Stroumboulopoulos. In 2022, with Caroline Cameron covering the 2022 Winter Olympics, Amber filled-in on Scotiabank Wednesday Night Hockey.

Beginning in the 2022-23 NHL season, Amber became the lead studio host for Rogers Monday Night Hockey.

Amber received his Bachelor of Arts degree in North American Studies from McGill University in Montreal in 1993, and a Master of Arts degree in Broadcast Journalism from Syracuse University in 1995.

Personal life
Amber's older sister is Jeannine Amber, an award-winning Senior Writer at Essence magazine, based in New York City. Amber's sister is also the author of the award winning book Rabbit: The Autobiography of Ms. Pat.  He is married with two children.

References

External links
 David Amber, Host, NHL On The Fly, retrieved 23 November 2010.
 

Living people
Black Canadian broadcasters
Canadian television sportscasters
Canadian expatriate journalists in the United States
Canadian television journalists
Toronto Raptors announcers
Journalists from Toronto
National Hockey League broadcasters
National Basketball Association broadcasters
College football announcers
1971 births